Zakouma National Park is a  national park in southeastern Chad, straddling the border of Guéra Region and Salamat Region. Zakouma is the nation's oldest national park, declared a national park in 1963 by presidential decree, giving it the highest form of protection available under the nation's laws. It has been managed by the nonprofit conservation organization African Parks since 2010 in partnership with Chad's government.

History 
Zakouma is Chad's oldest national park, established by the nation's government in 1963. Its wildlife have been threatened by the ivory trade and poaching, including by Janjaweed members. In 2007, militia forces attacked the park's headquarters for its stockpile of 1.5 tons of ivory, and killed three rangers. The government of Chad began working with African Parks in 2010 to help manage and protect the park and its wildlife, especially elephants. The park's anti-poaching strategy includes equipping approximately 60 rangers with GPS tracking units and radios to improve communications, mobility, and safety, as well as improving mobility through the use of horses and other vehicles. The European Union pledged €6.9m in 2011 to help protect the park for five years.

Elephant protection efforts expanded outside the park's boundaries in 2012, and an airstrip was constructed in Heban to make monitoring of the migrating animals easier. In August, Heban rangers destroyed a camp belonging to members of the Sudanese army after four elephants were killed. Three weeks later, the poachers attacked the Zakouma outpost at Heban and shot and killed multiple guards. Following the attack, additional bases were built, a second aircraft was purchased, and a rapid response team called the "Mambas" (after the snake of the same name) was formed to enhance security. 23 guards have died protecting Zakouma since 1998, including seven in 2007, four between 2008 and 2010, and six in 2012.

Chadians celebrated the park's fiftieth anniversary in February 2014. Zakouma held a ceremony to commemorate the occasion, which was attended by President Idriss Déby and included a ceremonial destruction of ivory by burning a pyre with a ton elephant tusks to discourage poaching.

African Parks and the Labuschagnes, who served as the park's managers from 2011–2017, have been credited with reducing poaching and increasing Zakouma's elephant population. African Parks took over management of ecologically valuable lands surrounding Zakouma, including the Siniaka-Minia Faunal Reserve and Bahr Salamat Faunal Reserve, in 2017.

Flora and Fauna 
Zakouma National Park is part of the Sudano-Sahelian vegetation zone, and has shrubland, high grasses, and Acacia forests. Plants recorded in the park include Combretaceae and Vachellia seyal (red acacia).

A variety of large mammals have been recorded in Zakouma, such as buffalo, elephant, Kordofan giraffe, hartebeest, leopard, and lion. In 2016, The Independent said there were increases to the park's buffalo, giraffe, and lion populations in recent years. The Times reported the presence of thousands of buffalo, more than 130 lions, and an "unknown" number of leopards, as well as plans to reintroduce black rhinoceros. It's estimated that 60% of 2,300 Kordofan giraffe remaining on earth are live in Zakouma National Park. A pack of nine African wild dogs were photographed in the southwest portion of this Zakouma National Park in November 2015.

During a study of the park's terrestrial small mammals, nine rodent and two shrew species were recorded. Rodents included the African grass rat, Congo gerbil, Guinea multimammate mouse, Heuglin's striped grass mouse, Johan's spiny mouse, Kemp's gerbil, Matthey's mouse, striped ground squirrel (Xerus erythropus), and Verheyen's multimammate mouse. The shrew species reported in the study were the savanna shrew and another belonging to the genus Suncus.

Birds include ostriches, cranes, eagles, egrets, herons, ibis, pelicans, and storks. Specific species include Abyssinian ground hornbills, black-breasted barbets, northern carmine bee-eaters, and red-billed queleas.

Elephants

The park's elephant population experienced significant declines during the 2000s, though reported size estimates have varied. According to National Geographic and Tech Times, Zakouma had more than 4,000 elephants in 2002, but fewer than 900 in 2005, and approximately 400–450 by 2010. China Daily said there were 3,885 and 3,020 elephants in the park in 2005 and 2006, respectively; similarly, Hindustan Times reported a population estimate of 3,500 in early 2006. The Independent reported a similar figure for 2010, following a major decline from 4,000 elephants in 2006. CNN, The New York Times, and The Times have said there were an estimated 4,300–4,350 elephants in Zakouma in 2002, and approximately 450 elephants in the park between late 2012 and April 2015. Zakouma's elephants were surveyed in 2014 as part of the Great Elephant Census. Following the nonprofit conservation organization African Parks assumption of management in 2010, and its extensive law enforcement and community engagement efforts, poaching dramatically declined and the herd has since stabilized, and has started to breed again. The park now has more than 500 elephants, as of February 2017, possibly the largest single herd in Africa.

More than 100 elephants were killed in 2006. Seven elephants were reportedly killed in 2007, marking a decrease compared to previous years because of improved efforts to protect Zakouma and its wildlife. Sixty elephants were reportedly killed by Sudanese poachers in early 2010, prior to African Parks' involvement. In 2015, CNN said there were no elephants poached in the park since late 2011, and no ivory removed from Zakouma in the last five years. There were zero to very few known elephant births between 2010 and 2013 because of environmental stresses, but approximately 50 calf births in 2014 and 2015, and an additional 70 in 2016. According to The Independent, there were 23 calves born in 2013, plus another 20 in 2015. Similarly, CNN reported in April 2015 that more than 40 calves were born since late 2013. There were reportedly no elephant poaching incidents between 2016 and February 2017.

Black rhinoceros
The park's last black rhinoceros were seen in 1972. During 2015–2016, African Parks initiated plans to reintroduce black rhinos to the park. Following the signature of a memorandum of understanding between the governments of Chad and South Africa in 2017, six black rhinos were provided by the latter nation's Department of Environmental Affairs to Zakouma under a custodianship agreement.

Tourism
In 2016, more than 5,000 locals stayed at the park's camps. Tinga Lodge, constructed by the government, opened in 1968 and houses up to 48 people. Camp Nomade, a mobile safari camp, opened in 2016.

See also
 Wildlife of Chad

References

Further reading

External links

 
 

1963 establishments in Chad
African Parks (organisation)
National parks of Chad
Protected areas established in 1963